Je parle à n'importe qui (English: I talk to anyone) is an album by Léo Ferré posthumously released in 2018 by La Mémoire et la Mer. This is the eighth Ferré's posthumous album and the first to be published since ten years.

This is a demo tape of one long poem recorded by hand and at home by the artist, during 1977. Ferré accompanies himself on the piano. 
The original tape has been indexed into 15 tracks.

Track listing
Texts & music by Léo Ferré.

Credits 
 Léo Ferré - Piano & vocals
 Tape restoration and mastering: Anaëlle Marsollier, at Studio La Buissonne
 Cover photography: Patrick Ullmann (1st edition), André Villers (2nd edition)
 Package Art & Design: Vital Maladrech (first edition)
 Liner notes: Alain Raemackers
 Coordinated by Alain Raemackers & Mathieu Ferré

External links 
 Album listening & presentation (French)

Léo Ferré albums
French-language albums
2018 albums